Zruč may refer to the following places in the Czech Republic:

 Zruč nad Sázavou, a town in Kutná Hora District, Central Bohemian Region
 Zruč-Senec, a village in Plzeň-North District, Plzeň Region